Kristofer is a masculine first name. It is a variant of the name Christopher.

People

Kristofer 

Notable people with the name Kristofer include:

Kristofer Åström, Swedish singer-songwriter
Kristofer Berglund (born 1988), Swedish professional ice hockey player
Kristofer Blindheim Grønskag (born 1984), Norwegian playwright
Kristofer Harris, English record producer, mixer and writer
 (1865–1906), Norwegian anarchist
 (born 1980), American zoologist
Kristofer Hivju (born 1978), Norwegian actor, producer, and writer
Kristofer Hill (born 1979), American musician, composer, and singer-songwriter
Kristofer Hjeltnes (disambiguation), various people
Kristofer Janson (1841–1917), Norwegian poet, author, and Unitarian clergyman
 (born 1988), Swedish wrestler
Kristofer Karlsson (born 1992), Australian team handball player
Kristofer Lamos (born 1974), former German high jumper
Kristofer Lange (1886–1977), Norwegian architect
Kristofer Leirdal (1915–2010), Norwegian sculptor and art educator
Kristofer Martin (born 1994), Filipino voice actor
Kristofer McNeeley (born 1974), American actor
Kristofer Myhre (1856–1945), Norwegian businessperson
Kristofer Pister, professor of electrical engineering and computer science; founder and CTO of Dust Networks
Kristofer Randers (1851–1917), Norwegian author and civil servant
 (born 1992), American archer
Kristofer Schipper (born 1934), Dutch sinologist
Kristofer Siimar (born 1998), Estonian tennis player
Kristofer Sinding-Larsen (1873–1948), Norwegian painter
Kristofer Steen (born 1974), Swedish musician and guitarist for hardcore/punk band Refused
Kristofer Stivenson (born 1964), Greek swimmer
Kristofer Uppdal (1878–1961), Norwegian poet and author

Kristófer 

Kristófer is an Icelandic masculine first name. Notable people with the name Kristófer include:

 Kristófer Acox (born 1993), Icelandic basketball player
 Kristófer Kristinsson (born 1999), Icelandic professional footballer

See also 

Norwegian masculine given names
Swedish masculine given names
Icelandic masculine given names